The European Youth Capital (abbreviated EYC) is the title awarded by the European Youth Forum to a European city, designed to empower young people, boost youth participation and strengthen European identity through projects focused on youth-related cultural, social, political and economic life and development. The 
European Youth Capital is an initiative by the European Youth Forum and is awarded for a period of one year. The first capital was chosen in 2009. Since 2014, the Congress of Local and Regional Authorities of the Council of Europe is an official endorsing partner the European Youth Capital title. The current, capital for the 2023 calendar year is Lublin, Poland.

Goals
The European Youth Capital aims in promoting intra-European co-operation between young people. Among the most important aspects of the institution is the betterment of everyday life of the youth in the city selected as youth capital, not just for the duration of the festivities, but in the long term. Additionally, participation of the youth in the design and implementation of the plans for each capital of youth is encouraged by the EYC. Ensuring that the youth are informed and actively involved in society and given opportunities for a better future is also a priority for the EYC initiative. Tourism and increased international prestige are some of the additional benefits of being named European Youth Capital.

Capitals (2009–2024)
Since 2009, there have been next European Youth Capitals:

See also
European Youth Forum
European Capital of Culture
European Region of Gastronomy

References

External links

Braga - European Youth Capital 2012
Thessaloniki - European Youth Capital 2014
Klaipeda - European Youth Capital 2021

Youth in Europe
 
Lists of cities in Europe
Lists of capitals
Youth events